The 1939–40 international cricket season was from September 1939 to April 1940. All international tournaments abandoned due to impact of Second World War. The season consisted domestic seasons for Australia, India and South Africa.

See also
 Cricket in World War II

References

International cricket competitions by season
1939 in cricket
1940 in cricket